Boxing Road is a station on Line 6 of the Shanghai Metro. It began operation on December 29, 2007.
The station is located at the junction of North Zhangyang Road and Boxing Road, in Shanghai's Pudong New Area. When travelling northbound on line 6, it is the last underground station.

References 

Railway stations in Shanghai
Line 6, Shanghai Metro
Shanghai Metro stations in Pudong
Railway stations in China opened in 2007